Lionel Elmer Wood (June 2, 1899 – September 17, 1965) was a Canadian curler. He was the lead of the 1930 Brier Champion team (skipped by his brother Pappy Wood), representing Manitoba.

References

Brier champions
1899 births
1965 deaths
Curlers from Winnipeg
Canadian male curlers